Ognjen Stojaković (born September 29, 1981) is a Serbian professional basketball coach, currently working as the director of player development and an assistant coach for the Denver Nuggets of the National Basketball Association (NBA).

Coaching career
Stojaković began his coaching career with FMP in Belgrade, Serbia. In August 2004, Stojaković became for the youth system coach. After nearly 7 years he finished stint in FMP at the end of 2010–11 season.

Denver Nuggets 
Stojaković began working with the Denver Nuggets prior to the 2013–14 NBA season, serving as the assistant video coordinator for three seasons. On the start of the 2016–17 NBA season he has been promoted to assistant coach for players development. Prior to the 2019–20 NBA season, he was promoted to the director of player development. At the 2023 NBA All-Star Game, he was an assistant coach for the Team LeBron under Nuggets' head coach Michael Malone.

See also
 List of Serbian NBA coaches
 List of foreign NBA coaches

References

1981 births
Living people
Denver Nuggets assistant coaches
Sportspeople from Belgrade
Serbian men's basketball coaches
Serbian expatriate basketball people in the United States
University of Belgrade Faculty of Sport and Physical Education alumni